Antoine Marie Joseph Paul Artaud, better known as Antonin Artaud (4 September 1896 – 4 March 1948), was a French writer, poet, dramatist, visual artist, essayist, actor and theatre director. He is widely recognized as a major figure of the European avant-garde. In particular, he had a profound influence on twentieth-century theatre through his conceptualization of the Theatre of Cruelty. Known for his raw, surreal and transgressive work, his texts explored themes from the cosmologies of ancient cultures, philosophy, the occult, mysticism and indigenous Mexican and Balinese practices.

Early life 
Antonin Artaud was born in Marseille, to Euphrasie Nalpas and Antoine-Roi Artaud. His parents were first cousins—his grandmothers were sisters from Smyrna (modern day İzmir, Turkey). His paternal grandmother, Catherine Chilé, was raised in Marseille, where she married Marius Artaud, a Frenchman. His maternal grandmother, Mariette Chilé, grew up in Smyrna, where she married Louis Nalpas, a local ship chandler. He was, throughout his life, greatly affected by his Greek ancestry. 

Euphrasie gave birth to nine children, but four were stillborn and two others died in childhood. Artaud was diagnosed with meningitis at age five, a disease which had no cure at the time. Biographer David Shafer points out, "given the frequency of such misdiagnoses, coupled with the absence of a treatment (and consequent near-minimal survival rate) and the symptoms he had, it's unlikely that Artaud actually contracted it." 

From 1907 to 1914, Artaud attended the Collége Sacré-Coeur. Here he began reading works by Arthur Rimbaud, Stéphane Mallarmé, and Edgar Allan Poe and founded a private literary magazine in collaboration with his friends. At the end of college he started to noticeably withdraw from social life and "destroyed most of his written work and gave away his books.":3 Distressed, his parents arranged for him to see a psychiatrist.:25 

Over the next five years Artaud was admitted to a series of sanatoria.:163 There was a pause in his treatment in 1916, when Artaud was conscripted into the French Army.:26 He was discharged due to "an unspecified health reason" (Artaud later claimed it was "due to sleepwalking", while his mother ascribed it to his "nervous condition").:4 In May 1919, the director of the sanatorium prescribed laudanum for Artaud, precipitating a lifelong addiction to that and other opiates.:162 In March 1921, Artaud moved to Paris where he was put under the psychiatric care of Dr Édouard Toulouse who took him in as a boarder.:29

Career

Theatrical apprenticeships 
In Paris, Artaud worked with a number of celebrated French "teacher-directors". This included Jacques Copeau, André Antoine, Georges and Ludmilla Pitoëff, Charles Dullin, Firmin Gémier and Lugné Poe. Lugné Poe, who gave Artaud his first work in a professional theatre, later described Artaud as "a painter lost in the midst of actors". His core theatrical training was as part of Dullin's troupe, Théâtre de l'Atelier, which he joined in 1921.:345 Artaud remained a member for eighteen months.:345 

As a member of Dullin's troupe, Artaud trained for 10 to 12 hours a day. Originally Artaud was a strong proponent of Dullin's teaching, stating: "Hearing Dullin teach I feel that I'm rediscovering ancient secrets and a whole forgotten mystique of production.":351 In particular, they shared a strong interest in east Asian theater, specifically performance traditions from Bali and Japan.:10 Dullin, however, did not think Western theater should be adopting the language and style of east Asian theatre. Instead he promoted a theatre of transposition; for Dullin, "To want to impose on our Western theater rules of a theatre of a long tradition which has its own symbolic language would be a great mistake."

Artaud came to disagree with many of Dullin's teachings.:352 Their final disagreement was over his performance of the Emperor Charlemagne in Alexandre Arnoux's Huon de Bordeaux and he left the troupe in 1923.:22 He joined the Pitoëff's troupe in 1923, remaining with them through the next year when he put more focus on his work in the cinema.:15-16

Literary career 
In 1923, Artaud mailed some of his poems to the journal La Nouvelle Revue Française (NRF); they were rejected, but the author of the poems intrigued the NRF's editor, Jacques Rivière, who requested a meeting. After meeting via post they continued their relationship. The compilation of these letters into an epistolary work, Correspondance avec Jacques Rivière, was Artaud's first major publication.:45 Artaud continued to publish some of his most important work in the NRF, including the "First Manifesto for a Theatre of Cruelty" (1932) and "Theatre and the plague" (1933).:105 He drew from these publications when putting together The Theatre and Its Double.:105

Work in the cinema 

Artaud also had an active career in the cinema working as a critic, actor, and writer. Artaud's performance as Jean-Paul Marat in Abel Gance's Napoléon (1927) used exaggerated movements to convey the fire of Marat's personality. He also played the monk Massieu in Carl Theodor Dreyer's The Passion of Joan of Arc (1928).:17 He wrote a number of film scenarios, ten of which have survived.:23 Only one of Artaud's scenarios was produced, The Seashell and the Clergyman (1928). Directed by Germaine Dulac, many critics and scholars consider it to be the first surrealist film.

Association with surrealists 
Artaud was briefly associated with the surrealists, before being expelled by André Breton in 1927.:21 This was in part due to the Surrealists increasing affiliation with the Communist Party in France.:274 As Ros Murray notes, "Artaud was not into politics at all, writing things like: I shit on Marxism. Additionally, "Breton was becoming very anti-theatre because he saw theatre as being bourgeois and anti-revolutionary." In "The Manifesto for an Abortive Theatre" (1926/27), written for the Theatre Alfred Jarry, Artaud makes a direct attack on the surrealists, whom he calls "bog-paper revolutionaries" that would "make us believe that to produce theatre today is a counter-revolutionary endeavour".:24 He declares they are "bowing down to Communism",:25 which is "a lazy man's revolution",:24 and calls for a more "essential metamorphosis" of society.:25

Théâtre Alfred Jarry (1926–1929) 
(For more details, including a full list of productions, see Théâtre Alfred Jarry)

In 1926, Artaud, Robert Aron and the expelled surrealist Roger Vitrac founded the Théâtre Alfred Jarry (TAJ). They staged four productions between June 1927 and January 1929. The Theatre was extremely short-lived, but was attended by an enormous range of European artists, including Arthur Adamov, André Gide, and Paul Valéry.:249

At the Paris Colonial Exposition (1931) 
In 1931, Artaud saw Balinese dance performed at the Paris Colonial Exposition. Although Artaud misunderstood much of what he saw, it influenced many of his ideas for theatre.:26 Adrian Curtin has noted the significance of the Balinese use of music and sound, stating that Artaud was struck by "the 'hypnotic' rhythms of the gamelan ensemble, its range of percussive effects, the variety of timbres that the musicians produced, and – most importantly, perhaps – the way in which the dancers' movements interacted dynamically with the musical elements instead of simply functioning as a type of background accompaniment."

The Cenci (1935) 
In 1935, Artaud staged an original adaptation of Percy Bysshe Shelley's The Cenci at the Théâtre des Folies-Wagram in Paris.:250 The drama was Artaud's only chance to stage a Theatre of Cruelty production, and he emphasised its cruelty and violence, in particular "its themes of incest, revenge and familial murder".:21 In the play's stage directions, Artaud describes the opening scene as "suggestive of extreme atmospheric turbulence, with wind-blown drapes, waves of suddenly amplified sound, and crowds of figures engaged in "furious orgy", accompanied by "a chorus of church bells", as well as the presence of numerous large mannequins. Scholar Adrian Curtin has argued for the importance of the "sonic aspects of the production, which did not merely support the action but motivated it obliquely".:251 While Shelley's version of The Cenci conveyed the motivations and anguish of the Cenci's daughter Beatrice with her father through monologues, Artaud was much more concerned with conveying the menacing nature of the Cenci's presence and the reverberations of their incest relationship though physical discordance, as if an invisible "force-field" surrounded them.

Jane Goodall writes of The Cenci, The predominance of action over reflection accelerates the development of events...the monologues...are cut in favor of sudden, jarring transitions...so that a spasmodic effect is created. Extreme fluctuations in pace, pitch, and tone heighten sensory awareness intensify ... the here and now of performance.:119The Cenci was a commercial failure, although it employed innovative sound effects—including the first theatrical use of the electronic instrument the Ondes Martenot—and had a set designed by Balthus.

Travels and institutionalization

Journey to Mexico 
In 1935 Artaud decided to go to Mexico, where he was convinced there was "a sort of deep movement in favour of a return to civilisation before Cortez".:11 The Mexican Legation in Paris gave him a travel grant, and he left for Mexico in January 1936, "where he would arrive one month later".:29-30 In 1936 he met his first Mexican-Parisian friend, the painter Federico Cantú, when Cantú gave lectures on the decadence of Western civilization. Artaud also studied and lived with the Tarahumaran people and participated in peyote rites, his writings about which were later released in a volume called Voyage to the Land of the Tarahumara,:14 published in English under the title The Peyote Dance (1976). The content of this work closely resembles the poems of his later days, concerned primarily with the supernatural. Artaud also recorded his horrific withdrawal from heroin upon entering the land of the Tarahumaras. Having deserted his last supply of the drug at a mountainside, he literally had to be hoisted onto his horse and soon resembled, in his words, "a giant, inflamed gum". Artaud returned to opiates later in life.

Ireland and repatriation to France 
In 1937, Artaud returned to France, where his friend René Thomas gave him a walking-stick of knotted wood that Artaud believed contained magical powers and was the 'most sacred relic of the Irish church, the Bachall Ísu, or "Staff of Jesus".:32 Artaud traveled to Ireland, landing at Cobh and travelling to Galway, possibly in an effort to return the staff.:33 Speaking very little English and no Gaelic whatsoever, he was unable to make himself understood.:33 He would not have been admitted at Cobh, according to Irish government documents, except that he carried a letter of introduction from the Paris embassy. Most of his trip was spent in a hotel room he was unable to pay for. He was forcibly removed from the grounds of Milltown House, a Jesuit community, when he refused to leave. Before deportation he was briefly confined in the notorious Mountjoy Prison.:152 According to Irish Government papers he was deported as "a destitute and undesirable alien". On his return trip by ship, Artaud believed he was being attacked by two crew members, and he retaliated; he was put in a straitjacket and he was involuntarily retained by the police upon his return to France.:34

His return from Ireland brought about the beginning of the final phase of Artaud's life, which was spent in different asylums. It was at this time that his best known work The Theatre and Its Double (1938) was published.:34 This book contained the two manifestos of the Theatre of Cruelty. There, "he proposed a theatre that was in effect a return to magic and ritual and he sought to create a new theatrical language of totem and gesture – a language of space devoid of dialogue that would appeal to all the senses." "Words say little to the mind," Artaud wrote, "compared to space thundering with images and crammed with sounds." He proposed "a theatre in which violent physical images crush and hypnotize the sensibility of the spectator seized by the theatre as by a whirlwind of higher forces." He considered formal theatres with their proscenium arches and playwrights with their scripts "a hindrance to the magic of genuine ritual".:6

In Rodez 
In 1943, when France was occupied by the Germans and Italians, Robert Desnos arranged to have Artaud transferred to the psychiatric hospital in Rodez, well inside Vichy territory, where he was put under the charge of Dr. Gaston Ferdière. At Rodez Artaud underwent therapy including electroshock treatments and art therapy.:194 The doctor believed that Artaud's habits of crafting magic spells, creating astrology charts, and drawing disturbing images were symptoms of mental illness. Artaud, at his peak began lashing out at others. Artaud denounced the electroshock treatments and consistently pleaded to have them suspended, while also ascribing to them "the benefit of having returned him to his name and to his self mastery".:196 Scholar Alexandra Lukes points out that "the 'recovery' of his name" might have been "a gesture to appease his doctors" conception of what constitutes health".:196 It was during this time that Artaud began writing and drawing again, after a long dormant period.  In 1946, Ferdière released Artaud to his friends, who placed him in the psychiatric clinic at Ivry-sur-Seine.

Final years 
At Ivry-sur-Seine Artaud's friends encouraged him to write and interest in his work was rekindled. He visited a Vincent van Gogh exhibition at the Orangerie in Paris and wrote the study Van Gogh le suicidé de la société ["Van Gogh, The Man Suicided by Society"]; in 1947, the French magazine K published it.:8 In 1949, the essay was the first of Artaud's to be translated in a United States based publication, the influential literary magazine Tiger's Eye.:8

He recorded  (To Have Done With the Judgment of God) on 22–29 November 1947. The work remained true to his vision for the theatre of cruelty, using "screams, rants and vocal shudders" to forward his vision.:1 Wladimir Porché, the Director of French Radio, shelved the work the day before its scheduled airing on 2 February 1948.:62 This was partly for its scatological, anti-American, and anti-religious references and pronouncements, but also because of its general randomness, with a cacophony of xylophonic sounds mixed with various percussion elements. While remaining true to his Theatre of Cruelty and reducing powerful emotions and expressions into audible sounds, Artaud had utilized various, somewhat alarming cries, screams, grunts, onomatopoeia, and glossolalia. 

As a result, Fernand Pouey, the director of dramatic and literary broadcasts for French radio, assembled a panel to consider the broadcast of :62 Among approximately 50 artists, writers, musicians, and journalists present for a private listening on 5 February 1948 were Jean Cocteau, Paul Éluard, Raymond Queneau, Jean-Louis Barrault, René Clair, Jean Paulhan, Maurice Nadeau, Georges Auric, Claude Mauriac, and René Char. Porché refused to broadcast it even though the panel were almost unanimously in favor of Artaud's work being broadcast.:62 Pouey left his job and the show was not heard again until 23 February 1948, at a private performance at Théâtre Washington. The work's first public broadcast did not take place until 8 July 1964 when the Los Angeles-based public radio station KPFK played an illegal copy provided by the artist Jean-Jacques Lebel.:1 The first French radio broadcast of  occurred 20 years after its original production.

Death 
In January 1948, Artaud was diagnosed with colorectal cancer. He died shortly afterwards, on 4 March 1948 in a psychiatric clinic in Ivry-sur-Seine, a commune in the southeastern suburbs of Paris. He was found by the gardener of the estate seated alone at the foot of his bed holding a shoe, and it was suspected that he died from a lethal dose of the drug chloral hydrate, although it is unknown whether he was aware of its lethality.

Legacy and influence 
Artaud has had a profound influence on theatre, avant-garde art, literature, psychiatry and other disciplines.

Theatre and Performance 
Artaud's has exerted a strong influence on the development of experimental theatre and performance art. His ideas helped inspire a movement away from the dominant role of language and rationalism in performance practice. Many of his works were not produced for the public until after his death. For instance, Spurt of Blood (1925) was not produced until 1964, when Peter Brook and Charles Marowitz staged it as part of their "Theatre of Cruelty" season at the Royal Shakespeare Company. Artists such Karen Finley, Spalding Gray, Liz LeCompte, Richard Foreman, Charles Marowitz, Sam Shepard, Joseph Chaikin, and more all named Artaud as one of their influences. 

His influence can be seen in:

 Barrault's adaptation of Kafka's The Trial (1947). 
 The Theatre of the Absurd, particularly the works of Jean Genet and Samuel Beckett. 
 Peter Brook's production of Marat/Sade in 1964, which was performed in New York and Paris, as well as London. 
 The Living Theatre.
 In the winter of 1968, Williams College offered a dedicated intersession class in Artaudian theatre, resulting in a week-long "Festival of Cruelty," under the direction of Keith Fowler. The Festival included productions of The Jet of Blood, All Writing is Pig Shit, and several original ritualized performances, one based on the Texas Tower killings and another created as an ensemble catharsis called The Resurrection of Pig Man. 
 In Canada, playwright Gary Botting created a series of Artaudian "happenings" from The Aeolian Stringer to Zen Rock Festival, and produced a dozen plays with an Artaudian theme, including Prometheus Re-Bound. 
 Charles Marowitz's play Artaud at Rodez is about the relationship between Artaud and Dr. Ferdière during Artaud's confinement at the psychiatric hospital in Rodez; the play was first performed in 1976 at the Teatro a Trastavere in Rome. 
 The writer and actor Tim Dalgleish wrote and produced the play The Life and Theatre of Antonin Artaud (1999) for the English physical theatre company Bare Bones. The play told Artaud's story from his early years of aspiration when he wished to be part of the establishment, through to his final years as a suffering, iconoclastic outsider.

Philosophy 
Artaud also had a significant influence on philosophers.:22 Gilles Deleuze and Félix Guattari, borrowed Artaud's phrase "the body without organs" to describe their conception of the virtual dimension of the body and, ultimately, the basic substratum of reality in their Capitalism and Schizophrenia. Philosopher Jacques Derrida provided one of the key philosophical treatments of Artaud's work through his concept of "parole soufflée". Feminist scholar Julia Kristeva also drew on Artaud for her theorisation of "subject in process".:22-3

Literature 
Poet Allen Ginsberg claimed Artaud's work, specifically "To Have Done with the Judgement of God", had a tremendous influence on his most famous poem "Howl".  The Latin American dramatic novel Yo-Yo Boing! by Giannina Braschi includes a debate between artists and poets concerning the merits of Artaud's "multiple talents" in comparison to the singular talents of other French writers.

Music 
The band Bauhaus included a song about the playwright, called "Antonin Artaud", on their album Burning from the Inside. Influential Argentine hard rock band Pescado Rabioso recorded an album titled Artaud. Their leader Luis Alberto Spinetta wrote the lyrics partly basing them on Artaud's writings. Composer John Zorn has written many works inspired by and dedicated to Artaud, including seven CDs: "Astronome", "Moonchild: Songs Without Words", "Six Litanies for Heliogabalus", "The Crucible", "Ipsissimus", "Templars: In Sacred Blood" and "The Last Judgment", a monodrama for voice and orchestra inspired by Artaud's late drawings "La Machine de l'être" (2000), "Le Momo" (1999) for violin and piano, and "Suppots et Suppliciations" (2012) for full orchestra.

Film 
Filmmaker E. Elias Merhige, during an interview by writer Scott Nicolay, cited Artaud as a key influence for the experimental film Begotten.

Filmography

Bibliography

Selected works

French

English translation

Critical and biographic works

In English 
Books
Barber, Stephen. Antonin Artaud: Blows and Bombs (Faber and Faber: London, 1993) 
Bradnock, Lucy. No More Masterpieces: Modern Art After Artaud (New Haven: Yale University Press, 2021).                          
Deleuze, Gilles and Félix Guattari. Anti-Oedipus: Capitalism and Schizophrenia. Trans. R. Hurley, H. Seem, and M. Lane. (New York: Viking Penguin, 1977).
Esslin, Martin. Antonin Artaud. London: John Calder, 1976.
Greene, Naomi. Antonin Artaud: Poet Without Words. (New York: Simon & Schuster, 1971).
Goodall, Jane. Artaud and the Gnostic Drama. Oxford: Clarendon Press; Oxford; New York: Oxford University Press, 1994. 
Jamieson, Lee. Antonin Artaud: From Theory to Practice (Greenwich Exchange: London, 2007) .
Jannarone, Kimberly. Artaud and His Doubles (Ann Arbor, MI, University of Michigan Press, 2010).
Knapp, Bettina. Antonin Artaud: Man of Vision. (Athens, OH: Swallow Press, 1980).
Morris, Blake. Antonin Artaud (London: Routledge, 2022).
Plunka, Gene A. (ed). Antonin Artaud and the Modern Theater. (Cranbury: Associated University Presses. 1994).
Rose, Mark. The Actor and His Double: Mime and Movement for the Theatre of Cruelty. (Actor Training Research Institute, 1986).
Shafer, David. Antonin Artaud. (London: Reaktion Books, 2016)

Articles and chapters
Bataille, George. "Surrealism Day to Day". In The Absence of Myth: Writings on Surrealism. Trans. Michael Richardson. London: Verso, 1994. 34–47.
Bersani, Leo. "Artaud, Defecation, and Birth". In A Future for Astyanax: Character and Desire in Literature. Boston: Little, Brown, 1976.
Blanchot, Maurice. "Cruel Poetic Reason (the rapacious need for flight)". In The Infinite Conversation. Trans. Susan Hanson. Minneapolis: University of Minnesota Press, 1993. 293–297.
Deleuze, Gilles. "Thirteenth Series of the Schizophrenic and the Little Girl". In The Logic of Sense. Trans. Mark Lester with Charles Stivale. Ed. Constantin V. Boundas. New York: Columbia University Press, 1990. 82–93.
Deleuze, Gilles and Félix Guattari. "28 November 1947: How Do You Make Yourself a Body Without Organs?". In A Thousand Plateaus: Capitalism and Schizophrenia. Trans. Brian Massumi. Minneapolis: University of Minnesota Press, 1987. 149–166.
Derrida, Jacques. "The Theatre of Cruelty" and "La Parole Souffle". In Writing and Difference. Trans. Alan Bass. Chicago: University of Chicago Press, 1978. 
Ferdière, Gaston. "I Looked after Antonin Artaud". In Artaud at Rodez. Marowitz, Charles (1977). pp. 103–112. London: Marion Boyars. .
Innes, Christopher. "Antonin Artaud and the Theatre of Cruelty". In Avant-Garde Theatre 1892–1992 (London: Routledge, 1993).
Jannarone, Kimberly. "The Theater Before Its Double: Artaud Directs in the Alfred Jarry Theater", Theatre Survey 46.2 (November 2005), 247–273.
Koch, Stephen. "On Artaud."  Tri-Quarterly, no. 6 (Spring 1966): 29–37.
Pireddu, Nicoletta. "The mark and the mask: psychosis in Artaud's alphabet of cruelty," Arachnē: An International Journal of Language and Literature 3 (1), 1996: 43–65.
Rainer, Friedrich. "The Deconstructed Self in Artaud and Brecht: Negation of Subject and Antitotalitarianism", Forum for Modern Language Studies, 26:3 (July 1990): 282–297.
Shattuck, Roger. "Artaud Possessed". In The Innocent Eye. New York: Farrar, Straus, Giroux, 1984. 169–186.
Sontag, Susan. "Approaching Artaud". In Under the Sign of Saturn. New York: Farrar, Straus and Giroux, 1980. 13–72. [Also printed as Introduction to Antonin Artaud: Selected Writings, ed. Sontag.]
Ward, Nigel "Fifty-one Shocks of Artaud", New Theatre Quarterly Vol. XV, Part 2 (NTQ58 May 1999): 123–128

In French 
Blanchot, Maurice. "Artaud"  (November 1956, no. 47): 873–881.
Brau, Jean-Louis. Antonin Artaud. Paris: La Table Ronde, 1971.
, 1969
 Florence de Mèredieu, Antonin Artaud, Portraits et Gris-gris, Paris: Blusson, 1984, new edition with additions, 2008. 
 Florence de Mèredieu, Antonin Artaud, Voyages, Paris: Blusson, 1992. 
 Florence de Mèredieu, Antonin Artaud, de l'ange, Paris: Blusson, 1992. 
 Florence de Mèredieu, Sur l'électrochoc, le cas Antonin Artaud, Paris: Blusson, 1996. 
 Florence de Mèredieu, C'était Antonin Artaud, biography, Fayard, 2006. 
 Florence de Mèredieu, La Chine d'Antonin Artaud / Le Japon d'Antonin Artaud, Paris: Blusson, 2006. 
 Florence de Mèredieu, L'Affaire Artaud, journal ethnographique, Paris: Fayard, 2009. 
 Florence de Mèredieu, Antonin Artaud dans la guerre, de Verdun à Hitler. L'hygiène mentale, Paris: Blusson, 2013.
 Florence de Mèredieu, Vincent van Gogh, Antonin Artaud. Ciné-roman. Ciné-peinture, Paris: Blusson, 2014.
 Florence de Mèredieu, BACON, ARTAUD, VINCI. Une blessure magnifique, Paris: Blusson, 2019. 
Virmaux, Alain. Antonin Artaud et le théâtre. Paris: Seghers, 1970.
Virmaux, Alain and Odette. Artaud: un bilan critique. Paris: Belfond, 1979.
Virmaux, Alain and Odette. Antonin Artaud: qui êtes-vous?  Lyon: La Manufacture, 1986.

In German 
Seegers, U. Alchemie des Sehens. Hermetische Kunst im 20. Jahrhundert. Antonin Artaud, Yves Klein, Sigmar Polke (Köln: Verlag der Buchhandlung Walther König, 2003).

References

External links 

 

 an anachronistic film account of Artaud's life.

 
1896 births
1948 deaths
20th-century French dramatists and playwrights
20th-century French male actors
20th-century French poets
20th-century male writers
Deaths from cancer in France
Deaths from colorectal cancer
French acting theorists
French artists
French male film actors
French male poets
French male silent film actors
French male stage actors
French military personnel of World War I
French people of Greek descent
French surrealist writers
Male actors from Marseille
Modern artists
Modernist theatre
People with schizophrenia
Poètes maudits
Prix Sainte-Beuve winners
Surrealist dramatists and playwrights
Surrealist poets
Theatre practitioners
Writers from Provence-Alpes-Côte d'Azur